Emmanuel Dieke (born September 23, 1990) is an American football defensive end for the Winnipeg Blue Bombers of the Canadian Football League. He has also been a member of the Miami Dolphins and the New York Giants. Emmanuel Dieke signed with the Blue Bombers on April 4, 2016.

References

External links
Career transactions

Living people
1990 births
Players of American football from Jackson, Mississippi
American football defensive ends
African-American players of American football
Georgia Tech Yellow Jackets football players
21st-century African-American sportspeople